The M16 is a short 14-kilometre road in Kalulushi District, Copperbelt Province, Zambia that connects Kalulushi with Sabina (north-west of Kitwe).

It starts at a junction with the M7 Road in Kalulushi (east of the town centre) and goes northwards for 14 kilometres, through the Sabina Toll Plaza, to end at a junction with the T3 Road at Sabina (15 kilometres north-west of the Kitwe city centre; 10 kilometres south-east of the Chambishi town centre).

This road is primarily used by heavy vehicles to avoid the commercial parts of Kitwe. In order for heavy vehicles coming from Ndola and Lusaka (using the T3 Road) to avoid the Kitwe City Centre and Kitwe's northern suburbs (which are busy commercial areas) on the way to DR Congo via Chingola, trucks are advised to use the M7 Road from Kitwe to Kalulushi, then the M16 Road from Kalulushi to Chambishi, as an alternative route. Just before Chambishi (at Sabina), heavy vehicles rejoin the main road and proceed through Chingola to the DR Congo Border (Kasumbalesa). Vehicles bypassing the northern part of Kitwe, where there is a tollgate on the T3 Road, by using this route is the primary reason why this route also has a tollgate before Sabina.

See also 
Roads in Zambia

References 

Roads in Zambia
Copperbelt Province